Édouard Chevreux (10 November 1846, in Paris – 10 January 1931, in Bône) was a French carcinologist.

Chevreux specialised in the study of Amphipoda, an order of malacostracan crustaceans. With Jean-Louis Fage (1883–1964), he was co-author of the section on "Amphipodes" in the Faune de France.

The genera Chevreuxius and Chevreuxiella are named after him, as are numerous crustacean species.

Selected writings 
 Sur le Gammarus berilloni catta   
 Voyage de la goëlette "Melita" aux Canaries et au Sénégal, 1889–1890, (1891) – Voyage of the schooner "Melita" to the Canary Islands and Senegal, 1889–1890.
 Amphipodes provenant des campagnes de l'Hirondelle (1885–1888), (1900) – Amphipods from the campaigns of the "Hirondelle" (1885–1888).  
 Paracyphocaris praedator; type d'un nouveau genre de Lysianassidae, (1905) – "Paracyphocaris praedator"; the type of a new genus of Lysianassidae.
 Amphipodes, (1906) – Amphipods
 Crustacés amphipodes, (1906) – Amphipod crustaceans 
 Orchomenella lobata: nouvelle espèce d'amphipode des régions arctiques, (1907) – "Orchomenella lobata", a new species of amphipod from the Arctic regions. 
 Campagnes de la Melita; les amphipodes d'Algérie et de Tunisie, (1910) – Campaigns of "Melita"; amphipods from a voyage to Algeria and Tunisia.
 Amphipodes provenant des campagnes scientifiques du prince Albert Ier de Monaco – Amphipods from scientific cruises of Prince Albert I of Monaco.

References 

French carcinologists
French zoologists
1846 births
1931 deaths
Scientists from Paris